Some Mothers Do 'Ave 'Em is a British sitcom broadcast on BBC1, created and written by Raymond Allen and starring Michael Crawford and Michele Dotrice. It was first broadcast in 1973 and ran for two series, including two Christmas specials in 1974 and 1975. After a three-year absence, the programme returned for a third series in 1978 and again in 2016 for a one-off special. The series regularly garnered 25 million viewers and was broadcast in 60 countries.

The series follows the accident-prone Frank Spencer and his tolerant wife Betty through Frank's various attempts to maintain a job, which frequently end in disaster. The sitcom was noted for its stunt work, performed by Crawford himself, and it featured several well-known and much-lampooned catchphrases that have become part of British popular culture. In the 2004 series Britain's Best Sitcom, Some Mothers Do 'Ave 'Em placed 22nd in the list of all British sitcoms.

Title
The series was originally conceived under the working title Have a Break, Take a Husband.

The expression "some mothers do have them" was once a common British euphemism to refer to a foolish or inept person.

Character of Frank Spencer
The eccentric, milquetoast Frank Spencer, who often wears his trademark beret and trench coat, is married to the apparently normal Betty (Michele Dotrice), and in later series they have a baby daughter, Jessica.

The character was popular with impressionists such as Mike Yarwood in the 1970s, particularly Frank's ostensible main catchphrase, "Ooh Betty", which may actually have been said in only one episode (Series 2, Episode 2).

Others catchphrases include a quavering "Oooh ...", usually uttered with Frank's forefinger to his mouth as he stands amidst the chaos of some disaster he has just caused. He also sometimes complains about being "ha-RASSed!", or, occasionally, "I've had a lot of ha-RASSments lately" (originally an American pronunciation). Other recurring catchphrases include references to "a bit of trouble" and to the cat having "done a whoopsie" (presumably a euphemism for having defecated in an inappropriate place, on one occasion in Spencer's beret). When Frank is pleased or confused, he will often use the catchphrases "Mmmm – nice!" or "Ohhh – nice!".

Frank is essentially a very sympathetic character who is loved by Betty despite his faults. He also venerates the memory of his late mother and treasures his daughter. References to Frank's mother suggest she was very much like her son. Frank claimed he last saw his father at Paddington Station when only 18 months old. Crawford has mentioned that he based many of Frank's reactions on those of a young child.

The final series was written by Raymond Allen, based on stories by Crawford (though not written by Crawford himself), and was produced after a break of five years, apart from two Christmas specials in the interim. Frank's character changes noticeably in this series, becoming more self-aware and keen to make himself appear more educated and well-spoken. He develops an air of pomposity, best demonstrated when someone enquires for "Mr. Spencer?", to which he habitually replies, "I am he." He also becomes more self-assured and more willing to defend himself when criticised, sometimes winning arguments by leaving his opponents dumbfounded by the bizarre nature of his statements.

Acknowledging the show's success in Australia, in the final series Frank mentions relations who live there and contemplates emigrating himself.

Legacy
Crawford found difficulty disassociating himself from the role despite his later career as a successful musical performer on the West End and Broadway stage and in popular musicals such as Barnum and The Phantom of the Opera.

Starring
 Michael Crawford as Frank Spencer
 Michele Dotrice as Betty Spencer (nee Fisher)

Casting
Ronnie Barker and Norman Wisdom were the BBC's first and second choices for the role of Frank. David Jason was also a contender, but he was rejected because BBC executives believed that he lacked star quality. However, the casting of Crawford proved effective because he invented many of Frank's mannerisms and catchphrases (some of which he had employed in the 1969 film Hello, Dolly!), and because of his ability to perform stunts and physical comedy.

Supporting cast
 Jessica Forte as Jessica Spencer (5 episodes)
 Jane Hylton as Mrs. Fisher (3 episodes)
 Dick Bentley as Grandad Spencer (3 episodes)
 Glynn Edwards as Mr. Lewis (3 episodes)
 Anthony Woodruff as Dr. Smedley (3 episodes)
 Hazel Bainbridge in roles as Mrs. Cooper, Mrs. Partridge and Miss Perkins (3 episodes)

Guest cameos
Most episodes would introduce at least one other character (such as a doctor, neighbour or employer) who would usually become unnerved by Frank's peculiar manner and clumsiness.

Guest cameo roles were played by actors including George Baker, James Cossins, Peter Jeffrey, Richard Wilson, Fulton Mackay, Bernard Hepton, Christopher Timothy, George Sewell, Bryan Pringle, Christopher Biggins, Milton Johns, Diane Holland, John Ringham, David Ryall, Gretchen Franklin, Geoffrey Chater, Royston Tickner, Michael Redfern, Babar Bhatti, Norman Chappell, Geoffrey Whitehead, Desmond Llewelyn and Elisabeth Sladen (who, in her autobiography, mentions that she was considered for the role of Betty).

Theme song
The theme song by Ronnie Hazlehurst features two piccolos spelling out the title in Morse code, excluding the apostrophes.

Episodes

Series One (Early 1973)

Series Two (Late 1973)

1974 and 1975 Christmas specials

Series Three (1978)

1978 Christmas special

2016 Sport Relief sketch

Repeats

The BBC has repeated Some Mothers Do 'Ave 'Em several times since the series was produced in the 1970s. British channels Gold, BBC Two and BBC Prime took over repeats of the programme in 2007. Drama showed the series in early 2023.

The programme has been shown on Catalan public television TV3 (Catalonia), the Gibraltar Broadcasting Corporation in the 1970s, in Nigeria on NTA since the 1980s, in Australia on the Nine Network's GO! from 2009 to 2010 and later on the Seven Network's digital channel 7TWO. It was also screened in the 1980s by TVNZ in New Zealand, where it was popular.

Special
On 18 March 2016, Michael Crawford and Michele Dotrice reprised their roles for a one-off sketch for Sport Relief. Gemma Arterton guest-stars as Jessica, alongside Jenson Button, Boris Johnson, Sir Paul McCartney, Roy Hodgson, Arsène Wenger, David Walliams, Jessica Ennis, Sir Bradley Wiggins, Clare Balding, Sir Chris Hoy, Sir Andy Murray and Jamie Murray playing themselves.

Documentary
A behind-the-scenes documentary entitled To Be Perfectly Frank was first broadcast on BBC 1 on Easter Monday, 11 April 1977.

Home video
In the United Kingdom, six episodes from Series 1 and various other episodes were originally released by BBC Video on VHS in the 1990s. Series 1 and Series 2 were released on VHS and DVD on 21 October 2002. Series 3 and the Christmas specials were released on VHS and DVD on 19 May 2003. The Complete Series was released on VHS and DVD on 6 October 2003 by Second Sight available. On 1 November 2010, 2 entertain reissued Some Mothers Do 'Ave 'Em – The Complete Christmas Specials. On 14 February 2011, Some Mothers Do 'Ave 'Em – The Complete Series and Christmas Specials was reissued by 2 entertain with new packaging.

The complete collection is now available from both BBC Store and iTunes as a digital download.

In Australia, Series 1–3 and the Christmas specials were released in 2003 and 2004. The complete boxed set was released in 2004 on DVD in region 4.

In the United States, 13 selected episodes were released on VHS in 1998 and reissued on Region 1 DVD in 2001. The complete series, including the 2016 Sport Relief special, was released on Region 1 DVD by the BBC and VEI in spring of 2021.

In popular culture
 In The Now Show, Prince Edward is usually portrayed as Frank Spencer by Hugh Dennis. In an episode from June 2010, a sketch featured Fabio Capello using Frank Spencer impressions as a motivational strategy for the England World Cup squad.
 The programme, and the character of Frank Spencer specifically, have even been mentioned several times in the UK House of Commons. On one notable occasion, Labour Party leader John Smith taunted Conservative prime minister John Major in a speech in 1993 by saying that recent government mishaps would be considered "too much" if submitted to the show's producers by scriptwriters.
 On 14 November 1998 during an edition of Noel's House Party, Michael Crawford appeared as Frank to celebrate 25 years of the show.
 English rock band Arctic Monkeys mention Frank Spencer in their song "You Probably Couldn't See for the Lights but You Were Staring Straight at Me" from their 2006 album, Whatever People Say I Am, That's What I'm Not with the lines: "I'm so tense, never tenser/Could all go a bit Frank Spencer."
 English band Reuben named a song after the show – "Some Mothers Do 'Ave 'Em" is the second track on their second album Very Fast Very Dangerous.
 The title of the series, "Some Mothers Do 'Ave 'Em", is similar to Jimmy Clitheroe's catchphrase from the late-1950s to early-1970s: "Don't Some Mothers 'Ave 'Em?"
 Many of Frank Spencer's antics and catchphrases have been lampooned by numerous comedians, including Mike Yarwood and Lenny Henry.
 In the One Foot in the Grave episode "The Trial", when Victor Meldrew calls a garden centre to complain about a yucca plant that was delivered to his house being placed inside the toilet bowl with compost (after Meldrew requested that it be put in the downstairs toilet), he says that he does not know who delivered the plant but adds that it "may have been Frank Spencer".

Stage adaptation
A stage adaptation, written and directed by Guy Unsworth based on the television series, began a UK tour at the Wyvern Theatre, Swindon in February 2018. It starred Joe Pasquale as Frank Spencer, with Sarah Earnshaw as Betty and Susie Blake as Mrs. Fisher.

Following the success of the 2018 tour, the production began another tour in February 2020, but because of the COVID-19 pandemic, many dates were postponed to 2022.

References

External links

1970s British sitcoms
1973 British television series debuts
1978 British television series endings
2016 television specials
BBC television sitcoms
English-language television shows
Television series about marriage
Television shows set in Bedfordshire